Francis Asbury Tarkenton (born February 3, 1940) is an American former professional football player who was a quarterback in the National Football League (NFL) for 18 seasons, primarily with the Minnesota Vikings. He played college football at the University of Georgia, where he was recognized as a twice first-team All-SEC, and was selected by the Vikings in the third round of the 1961 NFL Draft. After retiring from football, he became a media personality and computer software executive.

Tarkenton's tenure with the Vikings spanned thirteen non-consecutive seasons. He played for Minnesota six seasons from 1961 to 1966 when he was traded to the New York Giants for five seasons, and then traded back to Minnesota for his last seven seasons from 1972 to 1978. At the time of his retirement, Tarkenton owned many quarterback records. He was inducted into the Pro Football Hall of Fame in 1986 and the College Football Hall of Fame in 1987.

In addition to his football career, Tarkenton served as a commentator on Monday Night Football and a co-host of That's Incredible!. He also founded Tarkenton Software, a computer-program generator company, and he toured the U.S. promoting CASE (computer-aided software engineering) with Albert F. Case Jr. of Nastec Corporation. Tarkenton Software later merged with KnowledgeWare (with Tarkenton as president), until selling the company to Sterling Software in 1994.

Early life and education
Fran Tarkenton was born on February 3, 1940, in Richmond, Virginia. His father, Dallas Tarkenton, was a Methodist minister. Tarkenton went to Athens High School in Athens, Georgia, and later attended the University of Georgia, where he was the quarterback on the Bulldog football team and a member of the Sigma Alpha Epsilon fraternity.

Under head coach Wally Butts and with Tarkenton as quarterback, Georgia won the Southeastern Conference championship in 1959. Tarkenton was a first-team All-SEC selection in both 1959 and 1960.

Professional football career
The expansion Minnesota Vikings selected Tarkenton in the third round (29th overall) of the 1961 NFL Draft, and he was picked in the fifth round of the AFL draft by the Boston Patriots. He signed with the Vikings. Tarkenton, 21, played his first NFL game (and the Vikings' first game) on September 17 against the Chicago Bears, coming off the bench to lead the Vikings to a come-from-behind victory by passing for 250 yards and four touchdown passes and running for another as the Vikings defeated the Bears 37–13. He was the only player in NFL history to pass for four touchdowns in his first NFL game, until the feat was repeated by Marcus Mariota in the Tennessee Titans' 2015 season opener versus the Tampa Bay Buccaneers.

He played for the Vikings from 1961 through 1966. His early years with the team were plagued by the trouble expected for a newly created team, with the Vikings winning a total of 10 games combined in their first three seasons, with Tarkenton winning eight of them. He threw 18 touchdowns and 17 interceptions for 1,997 yards in his first season. He rushed for 308 yards on 56 rushes for five touchdowns. The following year, he threw 22 touchdowns and 25 interceptions for 2,595 yards. He rushed for 361 yards on 41 rushes for two touchdowns.

Tarkenton was traded to the New York Giants in March 1967 for three draft picks (and a player to be named later), at which time he moved to the suburb of New Rochelle, New York. In the first game of the 1969 season, the Giants played the Vikings. After trailing 23–10 in the fourth quarter, Tarkenton threw two touchdown passes to secure a 24–23 comeback victory over his former team. The 24 points allowed by Minnesota's defense were a season-worst for the unit, one more point than the Vikings allowed in losing Super Bowl IV to the Kansas City Chiefs in January.

Tarkenton enjoyed his best season with the Giants in 1970. They overcame an 0–3 start with nine wins in the next ten games and moved into position to win the NFC East division championship in week 14. However, New York was routed 31–3 by the Los Angeles Rams at Yankee Stadium to finish at 9–5, one game behind the division champion Dallas Cowboys and the wild card Detroit Lions. The 1970 season was the closest the Giants came to making the playoffs during a 17-year drought, from 1964 through 1980.

On January 27, 1972, Tarkenton was traded back to the Vikings for quarterback Norm Snead, receiver Bob Grim, running back Vince Clements, a first rounder in 1972 (24th overall–Larry Jacobson, defensive lineman) and a second rounder in 1973 (40th overall–Brad Van Pelt, linebacker). Tarkenton led the Vikings to three National Football Conference championships, but the Vikings lost each ensuing Super Bowl. In Tarkenton's first Super Bowl appearance, Minnesota lost to the Miami Dolphins 24–7 in Houston. They lost the second to the Pittsburgh Steelers 16–6 in New Orleans, and in the last Super Bowl Tarkenton played (and Minnesota's last Super Bowl to date), the Vikings lost 1977 Super Bowl to the Oakland Raiders 32–14 at the Rose Bowl in Pasadena, California.

In his eighteen NFL seasons, Tarkenton completed 3,686 of 6,467 passes for 47,003 yards and 342 touchdowns, with 266 interceptions, all of which were NFL records at the time of his retirement. Tarkenton's 47,003 career passing yards rank him fourteenth all time, while his 342 career passing touchdowns is eleventh all time in NFL history. He also is eighth on the all-time list of regular-season wins by a starting quarterback with 124 regular season victories. He used his impressive scrambling ability to rack up 3,674 rushing yards and 32 touchdowns on 675 carries. During his career, Tarkenton ran for a touchdown in 15 different seasons, an NFL record among quarterbacks. He ranks sixth in career rushing yards among quarterbacks, behind Randall Cunningham, Steve Young, Michael Vick, Cam Newton, and Russell Wilson.  He is also one of four NFL quarterbacks ever to rush for at least 300 yards in seven different seasons; the others are Cam Newton, Michael Vick and Tobin Rote. When he retired, Tarkenton held NFL career records in pass attempts, completions, yardage, touchdowns, rushing yards by a quarterback, and wins by a starting quarterback.

The Vikings finished the 1975 season with an NFC-best 12–2 record and Tarkenton won the NFL Most Valuable Player Award and the NFL Offensive Player of the Year Award while capturing All-Pro honors in the process. He was also a second-team All-Pro in 1973 and earned All-NFC selections in 1972 and 1976. He was named second-team All-NFC in 1970 and 1974. Tarkenton was selected to play in nine Pro Bowls.

Tarkenton was indecisive on his retirement during the last seven years of his playing career.

Despite not winning a Super Bowl, he won six playoff games, and in 1999 he was ranked #59 on The Sporting News list of the 100 Greatest Football Players.

Tarkenton was inducted into the Georgia Sports Hall of Fame in 1977, the Pro Football Hall of Fame in 1986, the College Football Hall of Fame in 1987, and the Athens, Georgia Athletic Hall of Fame in 2000.

Books
A biography of Tarkenton titled Better Scramble than Lose was published in 1969. This followed Tarkenton's 1967 autobiography No Time for Losing and preceded by several years his 1977 autobiography Tarkenton co-written with Jim Klobuchar. The autobiographies chronicle not only his football career but also his personal evolution from his early football days as a preacher's son. Tarkenton co-wrote with Brock Yates a book in 1971 titled Broken Patterns: The Education of a Quarterback, a chronicle of the 1970 New York Giants season.

In 1986, Tarkenton, with author Herb Resincow, wrote a novel titled Murder at the Super Bowl, the whodunit story of a football coach killed just before his team is to participate in the championship game.

Tarkenton wrote the self-help, motivational books Playing to Win in 1984, and How to Motivate People: The Team Strategy for Success in 1986. He also wrote the motivational self-help business book titled What Losing Taught Me About Winning, and Every Day is Game Day. In 1987, Tarkenton hosted a Think and Grow Rich TV infomercial that sold the book with an audio cassette version (the audio cassettes contained an introduction and conclusion by Tarkenton).

Business ventures and investments
Mark McCormack helped Tarkenton invest, making him wealthy enough to "retire this week if [he] wanted to", as New York  magazine wrote in 1971. Tarkenton was a pioneer in computer software, and founder of Tarkenton Software, a program generator company. He toured the United States promoting CASE or "computer-aided software engineering" with Albert F. Case, Jr. of Nastec Corporation, but ultimately merged his software firm with James Martin's KnowledgeWare, of which Tarkenton was president until selling the company to Sterling Software in 1994.

In 1999, Tarkenton was fined by federal regulators as part of a securities fraud sweep. According to the LA Times, "In Tarkenton's case, the Hall of Fame quarterback and 10 other former executives of his computer software and consulting firm, KnowledgeWare Inc., were accused of inflating by millions of dollars the company's earnings in reports for its fiscal year ended June 30, 1994. The former Minnesota Vikings quarterback agreed to pay a $100,000 fine and $54,187 in restitution. He did not admit any wrongdoing".

Since then, Tarkenton has been promoting various products and services including Tony Robbins and 1-800-BAR-NONE. He also founded GoSmallBiz, a small-business consulting website. He also operates an annuity marketing firm called Tarkenton Financial.

Politics

During the 2016 Republican National Convention, Tarkenton gave a speech endorsing Republican presidential nominee Donald Trump.

NFL career statistics

Personal/family life
Tarkenton has been married twice and has four children.

His first marriage was to Anna Elaine Merrell of Decatur, GA. They wed on December 22, 1960, at First Baptist Church in Decatur, Georgia, and divorced in March 1982. They had three children: daughter Angela (born 1964), son Matthew (born 1968), and daughter Melissa (born 1969).

Tarkenton married his second wife Linda Sebastian in the mid-1980s. They have one daughter, Hayley Gray Tarkenton (born 1988), a singer-songwriter.

See also

History of the New York Giants (1925-1978)
List of most consecutive starts by a National Football League quarterback
List of National Football League career passing touchdowns leaders
List of National Football League career passing yards leaders

References

1940 births
Living people
American football quarterbacks
College Football Hall of Fame inductees
Eastern Conference Pro Bowl players
Georgia Bulldogs football players
Georgia (U.S. state) Republicans
Minnesota Vikings players
National Football League announcers
New York Giants players
National Conference Pro Bowl players
National Football League Most Valuable Player Award winners
National Football League Offensive Player of the Year Award winners
National Football League players with retired numbers
Players of American football from Georgia (U.S. state)
Players of American football from Minneapolis
Players of American football from New York (state)
Players of American football from Richmond, Virginia
Pro Football Hall of Fame inductees
Sportspeople from Athens, Georgia
Sportspeople from New Rochelle, New York
Sportspeople from the Minneapolis–Saint Paul metropolitan area
Television personalities from New Rochelle, New York
Television personalities from Virginia
Western Conference Pro Bowl players